The European Pirates (PIRATES) or European Pirate Party (PPEU) is an association of parties aspiring to be recognised as a European political party by the European Union. It was founded on 21 March 2014 at the European Parliament in Brussels in the context of a conference on "European Internet Governance and Beyond", and consists of pirate parties of European countries. The parties cooperated to run a joint campaign for the 2014 European Parliament elections.

The founding meeting elected Amelia Andersdotter, Swedish Member of the European Parliament for Piratpartiet, as the first chairperson. The party's members elected to the European Parliament are in The Greens–European Free Alliance.

In November 2020 new board was elected. Mikuláš Peksa was confirmed as a chairperson, Florie Marie (France) and Katla Hólm Vilbergs Þórhildardóttir (Iceland) were elected as chairperson. Alessandro Ciofini (Italy), Lukáš Doležal, Jan Mareš (both Czech Republic) and Mia Utz, Oliver Herzig (both Germany) were elected as ordinary members of the board.

Member parties

Observer members

Former members

See also
 Pirate Party
 Pirate Parties International
 Young Pirates of Europe

Notes

References

Literature 

 Otjes, S. (2020). All on the same boat? Voting for pirate parties in comparative perspective. Politics, 40(1), 38–53. https://doi.org/10.1177/0263395719833274

External links

 

 
European
Pan-European political parties
2014 establishments in Europe
Civil liberties advocacy groups
Civil rights organizations
Computer law organizations
Digital rights organizations
Freedom of expression organizations
Freedom of speech
Intellectual property activism
Intellectual property organizations
Internet privacy organizations
Internet-related activism
Political parties established in 2014
Politics and technology
Privacy organizations